Kylesa is the debut album by American sludge metal band Kylesa. It was released on April 2, 2002 by Prank Records and is also available for download on iTunes and Amazon.

Track listing

Personnel 
Brian Duke – bass, vocals
Phillip Cope – guitar, vocals
Laura Pleasants – guitar, vocals
Christian Depken – drums, percussion

References 

2002 debut albums
Albums published posthumously
Kylesa albums